The Albertirsa–Zakhidnoukrainska–Vinnytsia powerline is a power transmission line between Ukraine and Hungary. It is a part of the former "Mir" transmission system between the Soviet Union and Comecon countries. As of today, it is the only 750 kV-powerline in Hungary and one of the few powerlines operated with this voltage in the European Union.

History
On 28 February 1974, the USSR, Bulgaria, Hungary, GDR, Poland and Czechoslovakia signed a cooperation agreement on construction of the 750 kV-line between Vinnytsia and Albertirsa, and substations Vinnytsia, Zakhidnoukrainska and Albertirsa.  Construction started in 1975 and it went in service in 1979.

Since the synchronization of the power grid of Hungary with that of the synchronous grid of Continental Europe (ENTSO-E) and because of economic reasons, the powerline went out of service in 1993, but was put in service again in 2002 after some new equipment was installed.

Technical description

From there it runs further east to Vinnytsia substation, which is located in Vinnytsia Raion (southeast of the city of Vinnytsia).

Portal pylons are used as suspension pylons. These are free-standing structures in areas, which are sometimes flooded and guyed ones in areas without flood-danger. As anchor pylons towers with one crossbar are used whereby the conductor is led around the pylon structure. The powerline was designed for the transmission of 2,000 MW electricity.

See also
 Rzeszów–Khmelnytskyi powerline
 Vetrino–Isaccea–Yuzhnoukrainsk powerline

References

Energy infrastructure completed in 1979
High-voltage transmission lines
Electric power infrastructure in Hungary
Electric power transmission systems in Ukraine
Vinnytsia
Hungary–Ukraine relations
1979 establishments in Hungary
1979 establishments in Ukraine